The Troubled Stateside is the second full-length studio album from Long Island melodic hardcore/punk band, Crime In Stereo. It was released in April, 2006 on Nitro Records.

Track listing
All songs written by Crime In Stereo
"Everything Changes/Nothing Is Ever Truly Lost" – 0:59      
"Bicycles for Afghanistan" – 2:58      
"Impending Glory of American Adulthood" – 3:25      
"I'm on the Guestlist Motherfucker" – 1:30      
"Sudan" – 3:26      
"Abre los Ojos" – 3:28      
"Gravity/Grace" – 3:57      
"Slow Math" – 2:36      
"I Stole This for You" – 3:02      
"Dark Island City" – 2:06      
"For Exes" – 3:26      
"I, Stateside" – 5:21

Credits
 Kristian Hallbert – vocals
 Alex Dunne – guitar
 Mike Musilli – bass
 Scotty Giffin – drums
 Dan McCabe – background vocals
 Produced and engineered by Mike Sapone

References

External links
 Nitro Records album page

Crime in Stereo albums
2006 albums
Nitro Records albums
Albums produced by Mike Sapone